Madan Mohan Mittal is an Indian lawyer, politician, and a leader of Bharatiya Janata Party in Punjab. He served as the Minister for Parliamentary Affairs, Health & Family Welfare and Social Security & Development of Women & Children in the government headed by Parkash Singh Badal.  Punjab Government. He is a member of Bharatiya Janta Party (BJP). He had done a lot of welfare work of his constituency Anandpur Sahib. He laid the foundation of a famous flyover project near nangal.He joined Shiromani Akali Dal on 29.01.2022 and made Senior Vice President of SAD.

Political career
He successfully contented election from Nangal in 1977 and 1992 as a BJP candidate. In 1997, he was re-elected from Nangal. In 2012, and he successfully contested from Anandpur Sahib. He was a cabinet minister holding the portfolio of Parliamentary Affairs, Health & Family Welfare, and Social Security & Development of Women & Children.

References

State cabinet ministers of Punjab, India
Living people
Punjab, India MLAs 1992–1997
Punjab, India MLAs 1997–2002
Punjab, India MLAs 2012–2017
Bharatiya Janata Party politicians from Punjab
Members of the Punjab Legislative Assembly
People from Ajmer district
1935 births
People from Rupnagar